The Life is a musical with a book by David Newman, Ira Gasman and Cy Coleman, music by Coleman, and lyrics by Gasman.

Based on an original idea by Gasman, the show explores the underbelly of Times Square's 42nd Street, inhabited by pimps and prostitutes, druggies and dealers, and runaways and street people in the era prior to its Disneyfication.

Background
Ira Gasman recalls walking on 42nd Street (in New York City) and seeing an arrest: "What theatre, I thought, right there in the street! It got me thinking about this show." After the Off-Broadway production in 1990, in 1994 Coleman and Gasman asked David Newman to help rewrite the show. Newman: ""Whatever it was back when they did the workshop, it's totally different now ..." Coleman brought in the director Michael Blakemore, who "steered the show along a tightrope, careful not to fall into the seediness below, toward a common humanity to which audiences can relate."

Productions
The show was first produced at the Off-Broadway Westbeth Theatre, running from July 30, 1990 to August 16, 1990. Joe Layton directed and choreographed, with a cast that featured Chuck Cooper, Lillias White, and Mamie Duncan-Gibbs.

The Broadway production, directed by Michael Blakemore, opened on April 26, 1997, at the Ethel Barrymore Theatre, where it closed on June 7, 1998, after 466 performances and 21 previews. Among the large cast were Pamela Isaacs, Chuck Cooper, Bellamy Young, Lillias White, and Sam Harris, winner of the first Star Search television competition in 1984. Choreography was by Joey McKneely, scenic design by Robin Wagner, costume design by Martin Pakledinaz, and lighting design by Richard Pilbrow.

White (Featured Actress in a Musical) and Cooper (Featured Actor in a Musical) both won 1997 Tony awards for their performances in this production.

The US Regional premiere took place at The Heights Theatre in Houston, Texas in April 1999. Directed by Ron Jones and choreographed by Jim Williams, with musical direction by Stephen Jones, the show featured Tamara Siler as Queen, Mia Fisher as Sonja, Illich Guardiola as Fleetwood, L. Jay Meyer as Lou, Johanna Beth Harris as Mary, Bob Beare as Lacy, and Jonathan McVey as JoJo.

The show had its UK premiere at London's Southwark Playhouse in March 2017 to coincide with the show's 20th anniversary on Broadway. This production was again directed by Michael Blakemore, and starred Sharon D. Clarke as Sonja and Cornell S. John as Memphis, T'Shan Williams as Queen, David Albury as Fleetwood, John Addison as Jojo, Lawrence Carmichael as Snickers, Jo Servi as Lacy, Jalisa Andrews as Chi Chi, Matthew Caputo as Oddjob, Omari Douglas as Slick, Aisha Jawando as Carmen, Thomas-Lee Kidd as Bobby/Dance Captain, Charlotte Reavey as April, Lucinda Shaw as Tracy, Johnathan Tweedie as Theodore, and Joanna Woodward as Mary. The production received four Off West End Theatre Awards from five nominations, winning Musical Production, Female in a Musical for Williams, Supporting Female for D. Clarke and Supporting Male for S. John.

In March 2022, New York City Center ENCORES! will present a concert adaptation of the musical, adapted and directed by Billy Porter, in his  directorial debut. This production will update the script to bring a somewhat more positive depiction of sex workers in the 1980s. The production will star Alexandra Grey as Queen, Antwayn Hopper as Memphis, Mykal Kilgore as Young JoJo, Ledisi as Sonja, Erika Olson as Mary, Destan Owens as Old JoJo, and Ken Robinson as Fleetwood.

Synopsis

Act I
The Life depicts the pulsating life on the Times Square streets in the 1980s, where everything had a price, especially sex—the garish topless bars, the transvestite joints, the hookers who worked the side walks at the bidding of their pimps ("Check It Out!").

Jojo, an opportunistic, conniving white hustler in the thick of the action, has a bare knuckled plan for feeding his ambition ("Use What You Got"). But among these unsavoury characters there are appealing people who have been caught in the web of these sordid surroundings. Sonja, a veteran hooker who has seen better days, befriends Queen who is on the street because her man, Fleetwood, a displaced Vietnam veteran, needs her support. She has saved her money and on this day plans to get away with Fleetwood and leave the life for good, enjoying, with Sonja ("A Lovely Day to Be Out of Jail"). Returning to her hotel room, Queen discovers that Fleetwood has spent half of her savings to pay off his drug debts and feed his habit.

Fleetwood has an unrealistic dream of attaining power and money ("A Piece of the Action"). Jojo tells him he'll never amount to anything as a pimp as long as he's romantically involved with the woman he's selling. Jojo takes him to the Port Authority where they find Mary, just off the bus from Minnesota, a girl with the mien of an angel but, as we eventually find out, she's no angel. Jojo grabs at her suitcase so that Fleetwood can rescue it and become her hero.

The demi-monde hangs out at a bar owned by Lacy, who has seen it all but has certain affection for his clientele. In the company of her sister whores, Sonja bemoans the wear and tear of her life ("The Oldest Profession"). When Fleetwood and Mary arrive, Memphis, the "biggest businessman on the block" comments on the professionalism of his trade and soon zeroes in on the newcomer ("Don't Take Much"). 
Reluctantly, Queen takes Mary to the room she shares with Fleetwood and tries to persuade her to go home ("Go Home"). Later, as prostitutes eye potential customers, a gospel group parades by ("You Can't Get to Heaven"). The girls defiantly stand up for themselves ("My Body"), while the pimps complain about the harassment of the police ("Why Don't They Leave Us Alone?").

Jojo cajoles Mary into taking a turn as a go-go dancer. A smashing success, she celebrates her good fortune with Fleetwood and Jojo, who has her in mind for his "mentor" Lou, a gaudy Los Angeles producer of "motion pictures" of the triple X genre, who's looking for fresh corn-fed talent ("Easy Money").

Once again in jail, Queen reflects on her attachment to Fleetwood ("He's No Good"); while, enticed by Mary, Jojo and Fleetwood spend the night with her in a threesome. As Fleetwood turns his attentions toward Mary, Memphis makes his move to put "Queen in his deck". Queen discovers what's been going on between Fleetwood and Mary, and decides she's finally had enough ("I'm Leaving You"). As everyone parties at The Hookers' Ball, Lou makes off with Mary, while Queen, shunning Fleetwood, attaches herself to Memphis ("The Hooker's Ball").

Act II
Over a game of Three-card Monte ("Step Right Up"), Jojo and the pimps discuss their "silent partner", Mr. Greed ("Mr. Greed"). In Memphis' spacious apartment, Queen thanks him for getting her out of jail and for the beautiful dress he gave her to wear to the Hookers' Ball; but Memphis makes it very clear that the dress was a $6,000 loan that she must repay with her earnings ("My Way or the Highway"). He warns Queen that she better not leave town "cause you'll be coming back real soon for a funeral – Fleetwood's; followed shortly by your own".

Queen tells Sonja that she must find Fleetwood and warn him about Memphis' threat. She asks Jojo to tell Fleetwood to meet her the next morning at Lacy's. Meanwhile, Mary, with Lou, toasts her acceptance of his offer of a movie career ("People Magazine").

The next morning Jojo double crosses Queen and comes to Lacy's with Memphis, who brutally flogs the terrified woman. When Fleetwood arrives, Queen reminds him of what they once had together ("We Had a Dream"). When Fleetwood returns to his hotel, he finds Mary leaving for Los Angeles.

Near the Lincoln Tunnel, Memphis' henchman, Snickers, pushes Queen to get "plenty of action tonight. Memphis is dependin' on it" ("Use What You Got" (Reprise)). She, Sonja and other girls share their hopes for the future ("'Someday' is for Suckers").

Later, near the Hudson River in a spot once special to Queen and Fleetwood, Sonja hands Queen a bus ticket and a suitcase in a desperate attempt to get her away from Memphis. Fleetwood unexpectedly appears and tries to talk Queen into making a new start ("We Gotta Go"), but Queen bitterly rejects him. Jojo guides Memphis onto the scene. Fleetwood pulls a gun on Memphis, but Jojo knocks the gun loose as Memphis mortally stabs Fleetwood; Queen seizes the fallen gun and shoots Memphis. Sonja decides to take the rap for killing Memphis, claiming self-defence; she and Queen say goodbye ("My Friend"), then Queen departs for the bus, which will carry her to freedom, as Sonja surrenders to the police. ("Check It Out!" (Reprise))

Songs

 Act I
 "Check It Out!" – Cue and Company
 "Use What You Got" – Jojo and Company
 "A Lovely Day to Be Out of Jail" – Queen and Sonja
 "A Piece of the Action" – Fleetwood
 "The Oldest Profession" – Sonja
 "Don't Take Much" – Memphis
 "Go Home" – Queen and Mary
 “Patsette, you whore” — Betska and Sonja
 "You Can't Get to Heaven" – Queen, Sonja and Street Evangelists
 "My Body" – Frenchie, Chichi, Tracy, Carmen, Sonja, Queen and April
 "Why Don't They Leave Us Alone?" – Company
 "Easy Money" – Mary, Jojo and Fleetwood
 "He's No Good" – Queen
 "I'm Leaving You" – Queen
 "The Hooker's Ball" – Lacy and Company

 Act II
 "Step Right Up" – Enrique, Slick, Oddjob and Bobby
 "Mr. Greed" – Jojo, Bobby, Enrique, Oddjob and Slick
 "My Way or the Highway" – Memphis and Queen
 "People Magazine" – Lou and Mary
 "We Had a Dream" – Queen
 "Use What You Got" (Reprise) – Mary, Lou and Jojo
 "'Someday' is for Suckers" – Sonja, Frenchie, April, Shatellia, Carmen and Chichi
 "We Gotta Go" – Fleetwood and Queen
 "My Friend" –  Queen and Sonja    
 "Check It Out!" (Reprise) – Company

Awards and nominations

Original Broadway production

Original London production

References

External links
 
 
 The Life at Playbill
 The Life plot and production notes at guidetomusicaltheatre.com

1990 musicals
Off-Broadway musicals
Broadway musicals
Original musicals
Plays set in New York City
Tony Award-winning musicals
Musicals by Cy Coleman